This is a list of Pirates of the Caribbean film actors who portrayed appearing in the film series. The list below is sorted by film and the character's surname, as some characters have been portrayed by multiple actors.

Cast and characters

References

Pirates of the Caribbean (film series)
Pirates of the Caribbean